Tyrteu Rocha Vianna  (November 28, 1898 – September 21, 1963) was a Brazilian poet avant-garde and pioneer amateur radio, and large landowner of Rio Grande do Sul, southern Brazil.

He was born in São Francisco de Assis, Rio Grande do Sul, a small isolated town where he lived most of his life; despite this, has been regarded by critics as one of the most gifted or the most modernist poet of the early twentieth century in Rio Grande do Sul.

Had influence of Futurism mostly, but also the Manifesto Antropófago and Cubism. Has just published a book, and was author that has been little known and little appreciated by his countrymen and contemporaries.  He died in Alegrete, aged 64.

References

External links
Tyrteu Rocha Vianna poems in Spanish by Adrian'dos Delima. RIM&VIA Poesia Nova. Canoas. Rio Grande do Sul. 11/25/2010.

Brazilian male poets
Futurist writers
1898 births
1963 deaths
20th-century Brazilian poets
20th-century Brazilian male writers
Amateur radio people